David Edward Byrd (born April 4, 1941) is an American graphic artist, designer, illustrator and painter. Many of his design are considered to have helped define the look of rock and roll music starting in the 1960s.  He is most well known for his poster designs, including his rock posters for the Fillmore East as well as his Broadway theatre posters.

Early life
David Byrd was born April 4, 1941, in what is now Cleveland, Tennessee[9] and was raised in Miami Beach, Florida.

Education
He graduated from Miami Beach High School in 1959, attended the Boston Museum School for a year and then Carnegie-Mellon University in Pittsburgh, Pennsylvania where he received a BFA in Painting and Design in 1964 and an MFA in Painting and Printmaking in 1966. From 1970 to 1979, Byrd taught at the Pratt Institute and the School of Visual Arts. 
After receiving his BFA, Byrd moved to Pittsburgh to work at WQED-TV, where he did design for the nascent Mister Rogers' Neighborhood show. He was subsequently asked back to Carnegie-Mellon to complete his graduate work.

Rock Posters
In 1968, a number of college classmates (including Joshua White of Joshua Light Show) encouraged rock promoter Bill Graham to hire Byrd to create posters for the newly opened Fillmore East Ballroom in Manhattan's East Village. Byrd was reportedly hired on the spot after showing his portfolio to Bill Graham and signed on as the exclusive poster and program designer, beginning with a poster for the upcoming Traffic event. In the period 1968 to 1973, he and Fantasy Unlimited created posters for  Jimi Hendrix, Iron Butterfly, Jefferson Airplane, Ravi Shankar, Traffic, and Bill Graham favorite the Grateful Dead. The poster that Byrd created for Bill Graham's Fillmore East, for the Jimi Hendrix Experience, was voted #8 in the Top 25 Rock Posters by Billboard Magazine. Byrd also created the poster for The Rolling Stones American Tour 1969. When the four members of the rock band KISS released individual solo albums in 1978, Byrd was hired to create an individual poster for each album, designed in such a way so they all could be hung together as a mural. Byrd worked with The Who for their rock opera Tommy, designing the poster for the band's 1971 performance at the Metropolitan Opera House.

Original Woodstock Festival Poster
In 1969, Byrd created the original poster for Woodstock, but as the festival was subsequently moved and Byrd (then on vacation on the Caribbean island of Saint Martin) could not be reached, his original design went unused.

Broadway Posters
He designed posters for notable stage musicals including Follies, Godspell, The Robber Bridegroom, The Grand Tour, The Survival of St. Joan, Jesus Christ Superstar, Little Shop of Horrors, and others.

Move to Los Angeles - Van Halen, Warner Bros.
In 1981, Byrd came to Los Angeles to work as the Art Director for the Fair Warning Tour for Van Halen. After that he did more poster creations in and around Los Angeles for, among others, The Mark Taper Forum, The Ahmanson Theatre, The Doolittle Theatre (in Hollywood, CA), and The Pasadena Playhouse.

From 1991 to 2002, Byrd was Senior Illustrator at Warner Brothers Creative Services, creating illustrations, backgrounds and style guides for all the Looney Tunes and Hanna–Barbera characters. His other tasks included working with writer J. K. Rowling on the first three books to make a visual cornerstone for the Harry Potter films that were to follow.

Gay Advocacy and Design
In 1976, Byrd illustrated the cover of the first edition of Christopher Street Magazine, the first gay literary magazine. From 1984 to 1986, he was Art Director of the national gay news magazine The Advocate.

Personal life
In 1985, David began Byrd/Beserra Studios, with his partner Jolino Beserra, a noted Mosaic Artist.

Accolades and awards
In 1973, Byrd along with several other prominent illustrators, received a Grammy Award for the album design and packaging of Tommy (by The Who).

In 2007, the Ringling College of Art and Design presented a retrospective of the work of Byrd's work.

Further reading
Hearn, Michael Patrick; The Art of the Broadway Poster; New York, Ballantine Books; First Edition 1980;

References

External links
David Edward Byrd's website

1941 births
Living people
people from Cleveland, Tennessee
people from Miami Beach, Florida
Album-cover and concert-poster artists
American graphic designers
American poster artists
American illustrators
Carnegie Mellon University College of Fine Arts alumni
Miami Beach Senior High School alumni